Montegiardino is one of the 9 communes or castelli of San Marino. It has 967 inhabitants (May 2018) in an area of 3.31 km2.

The residences of the University of the Republic of San Marino, the country's only university, are located in Montegiardino.

Etymology
From Italian monte ("mountain") + giardino ("garden").

Geography
Due to its small size, it is the smallest subdivision of the country in population. It also the smallest country subdivision in the world. It borders the San Marino municipalities Fiorentino and Faetano and the Italian municipalities Monte Grimano and Sassofeltrio.

History
Montegiardino was added due to the last territorial expansion of San Marino, in 1463.

Parishes
Montegiardino has 1 parish (curazia): Cerbaiola.

Notable residents
Singer and Sammarinese Eurovision entrant, Anita Simoncini hails from Montegiardino.

References

External links

 
Municipalities of San Marino